Dom Pedro Ponce de Leon, O.S.B., (1520–1584) was a Spanish Benedictine monk who is often credited as being "the first teacher for the deaf".

Biography
Ponce de Leon established a school for the deaf at the San Salvador Monastery in Oña.  His students were almost all children of wealthy aristocrats who could afford private tutoring.  His work with deaf children focused on helping them to learn how to speak language audibly.  He also instructed children in writing and in simple gestures.

Ponce de Leon is not known to have developed a working sign language, but there is some indication from the writings of Juan Pablo Bonet—who never credited him for his method—that Ponce de Leon developed a manual alphabet which would allow a student who mastered it to spell out (letter by letter) any word. This alphabet was based, in whole or in part, on the simple hand gestures used by monks living in silence.

Ponce de Leon's work with the deaf was considered bold by contemporaries, as the prevailing opinion among most Europeans in the 16th century was that the deaf were incapable of being educated.  Many laymen even believed that the deaf were too simple-minded to be eligible for salvation under Christian doctrine.

In Ponce, Puerto Rico, there is a school for deaf children named Colegio Fray Pedro Ponce de León. It is located in Urbanización La Rambla.

References

External links

A brief article (scroll to the bottom of the page) detailing recent research on de Leon
The "Education of the Deaf and Dumb" article from the Catholic Encyclopedia (1913), which mentions de Leon's work, among others

1520 births
1584 deaths
16th-century Spanish Roman Catholic priests
Spanish Benedictines
People from the Province of Burgos
Educators of the deaf